Clostebol propionate (brand name Yonchlon), also known as 4-chlorotestosterone 17β-propionate or as 4-chloroandrost-4-en-17β-ol-3-one 17β-propionate, is a synthetic, injected anabolic-androgenic steroid (AAS) and a derivative of testosterone. It is an androgen ester – specifically, the C17β propionate ester of clostebol (4-chlorotestosterone) – and acts as a prodrug of clostebol in the body. Clostebol acetate is administered via intramuscular injection.

See also
 Clostebol acetate
 Clostebol caproate
 Norclostebol
 Norclostebol acetate
 Oxabolone
 Oxabolone cipionate

References

Propionate esters
Androgen esters
Androgens and anabolic steroids
Androstanes
Organochlorides
Prodrugs
World Anti-Doping Agency prohibited substances